Khyber News is a News and Current Affairs Pashto satellite television channel in Pakistan, which was launched in August 2007. The channel broadcasts 24 hours a day, providing news, current affairs programs and informative programs to the Pashtun population of Pakistan and Afghanistan as well as those living in the Middle East, Europe, and Australia. Unlike most TV stations in Pakistan, Khyber News programs are only in Pashto language and English language.

The main office of Khyber News is located in Islamabad, Pakistan. It also has regional offices in the cities of Peshawar, Karachi and Quetta in Pakistan as well as in Jalalabad, Kabul and Kandahar in Afghanistan and Dubai.

See also 

 List of news channels in Pakistan

References 
Khyber News - Official website

Television stations in Pakistan
Mass media in Pakistan
Pashto mass media
Pashto-language television stations
Television channels and stations established in 2007
Mass media in Islamabad